Zanussi is a surname of Italian origin. Notable people with surname include:

 Joe Zanussi (born 1947), Canadian retired professional ice hockey player
 Krzysztof Zanussi (born 1939),  Polish film and theatre director, producer and screenwriter
 Lino Zanussi (1920-1968), Italian businessman and appliance manufacturer
 Per Zanussi (born 1977), Italian–Norwegian jazz musician (upright bass) and composer
 Ron Zanussi (born 1956),  Canadian retired professional Hockey right winger
 Stefania Zanussi (born 1965), Italian basketball player

See also 
 Zani (disambiguation)
 Zanotti

Italian-language surnames
Patronymic surnames
Surnames from given names